Hawaii Community College is a public community college with two campuses on the Island of Hawaii. It is part of the University of Hawaii system and is accredited by the Accrediting Commission for Community and Junior Colleges.

Hawaii Community College at Hilo
Hawaii Community College at Hilo is a public, co-educational commuter college in Hilo, Hawaii on the Island of Hawaii.  It is one of ten branches of the University of Hawaii system anchored by the University of Hawaii at Mānoa in Honolulu and is accredited by the Western Association of Schools and Colleges.  The campus is less than a mile away from the University of Hawaii at Hilo.  The two schools share some facilities, including the library, some classrooms and offices. The college began in 1941 as the Hawaii Vocational School.

Hawaii Community College at Pālamanui

Hawaii Community College at Pālamanui, North Kona, opened in August, 2015. Associate degrees in culinary art, nursing, liberal arts, science, etc., can be obtained.

References

External links
 

Community colleges in Hawaii
University of Hawaiʻi
Education in Hawaii County, Hawaii
Schools accredited by the Western Association of Schools and Colleges
Buildings and structures in Hilo, Hawaii
1941 establishments in Hawaii
Kailua-Kona, Hawaii
Education in Hilo, Hawaii